Ochmacanthus is a genus of pencil catfishes native to South America. These species are distributed in South America. O. alternus and O. orinoco originate from the Rio Negro and Orinoco River basins of Brazil and Venezuela. O. batrachstoma inhabits the Paraguay River basin in Brazil. O. flabelliferus lives in river drainages in Guyana and Venezuela. O. reinhardtii is known from the Amazon River basin in Brazil and drainages in French Guiana.

Species 
There are currently 5 recognized species in this genus:
 Ochmacanthus alternus G. S. Myers, 1927
 Ochmacanthus batrachostoma (A. Miranda-Ribeiro, 1912) 
 Ochmacanthus flabelliferus Eigenmann, 1912
 Ochmacanthus orinoco G. S. Myers, 1927
 Ochmacanthus reinhardtii (Steindachner, 1882)

References

Trichomycteridae
Fish of South America
Fish of the Amazon basin
Fish of Brazil
Fish of French Guiana
Fish of Guyana
Fish of Venezuela
Freshwater fish genera
Catfish genera
Taxa named by Carl H. Eigenmann